George W. Cobb,  (July 2, 1914 - January 15, 1986) is a notable and prolific golf course designer who created the Par-3 course at Augusta National Golf Club among more than one hundred courses and renovated many, including his own early work. He strove to create attractive layouts that the average golfer would find enjoyable, not frustrating.

Biography

Early life
Cobb was born into a family of golfers in Savannah, Georgia, learned to play as a child and was a scratch golfer.  He had an older brother, W.E. and a younger sister, Mary A.
Cobb attended the University of Georgia, where he played on the college golf team. He studied landscape architecture and graduated in 1937. He was hired by the National Park Service and worked as a landscape architect until 1941.

Military
During World War II, Cobb was a Marine Corps engineering officer at Camp Lejeune in North Carolina. Because he was an avid golfer and landscape architect, he was assigned the task of constructing a golf course for use in physical rehabilitation of injured GIs, but he had no experience in course design. Cobb was permitted to hire experienced course architect Fred Findlay to provide design assistance. Cobb handled the construction superintendent responsibilities on this and a subsequent course at Lejeune.
In 1946, Cobb designed and built the course at the Marine Corps Air Station Cherry Point on his own, then was discharged from the Marines during 1947.

Vocation
After the experience provided by the military, Cobb decided that he enjoyed building golf courses. He started his own golf design business and created six courses, but when the Korean War escalated, he was recalled to active duty in 1951. Released from service, Cobb initially moved to Chapel Hill, North Carolina and was working on the Country Club of Sapphire Valley when he was hired to build the Green Valley Country Club. While working on Green Valley in the spring of 1956, he was offered and accepted a position as a director of Hollyridge Corporation, the developer. He and his family settled in Greenville, South Carolina, where they remained. In 1958 he was named general manager of the club, but resigned when his design business proliferated during 1960, when he had eight South Carolina courses under construction or being designed.

Augusta
Cobb's shortest course may actually be his most prominent creation.
Cobb was design consultant at Augusta National Golf Club from the mid-1950s and became good friends with Bobby Jones and Clifford Roberts, chairman of Augusta National. The club decided to add a par 3, nine-hole course in 1958, which Alister MacKenzie had suggested in the 1930s. Cobb was asked to design it with input from Roberts, and the 1,060 yard "little course" opened in 1959. The Par-3 Contest has been held on Wednesday of Masters week since 1960. In fifty years of Masters play, no one has ever won the Par-3 and the main tournament in the same week.
Cobb added a fresh touch to the "big course" in 1967 and 1977. The only other Par 3 course Cobb ever designed was at Vestavia Country Club in Birmingham, Alabama.

Associate
John LaFoy grew up in Greenville, and was close friends with Cobb's son, George, Jr. LaFoy studied architecture and graduated from Clemson University in 1968. He apprenticed with George Cobb before the Vietnam War forced him into the service. Like Cobb, LaFoy chose the Marine Corps. After his discharge, LaFoy returned to work with Cobb, and in 1971, he became Cobb's partner. They collaborated on every subsequent course the firm built, and when Cobb's health began to fail in the early 1980s, he ran the company. After Cobb's death in 1986, LaFoy continued designing and remodeling courses, and in 1999, he served as president of the American Society of Golf Course Architects.

Personal
While he was stationed at Camp LeJeune, Cobb married and had a son, George, Jr. and a daughter, Virginia.

Courses designed
The following table is a (partial) list of courses that George Cobb either designed alone (prior to 1971) or co-designed with John LaFoy.

Click arrow box in column heading to sort by that attribute.

References

Further reading
 Golf In The Upstate - Since 1895, The Biography of George Cobb with Mark William Shaw,  published by McGraw-Hill, March 1999

 GeorgeCobb.com - Official website

American male golfers
Georgia Bulldogs men's golfers
Golf course architects
Golfers from Savannah, Georgia
American landscape architects
1914 births
1986 deaths
United States Marine Corps personnel of World War II